Mortimer is an English surname, and occasionally a given name.

Norman origins 
The surname Mortimer has a Norman origin, deriving from the village of Mortemer, Seine-Maritime, Normandy. A Norman castle existed at Mortemer from an early point; one 11th century figure associated with the castle was Roger, lord of Mortemer, who fought in the Battle of Mortemer in 1054. The 12th century abbey of Mortemer at Lisors near Lyons-la-Forêt is assumed to share the same etymological origin, and was granted to the Cistercian order by Henry II in the 1180s. According to the toponymists Albert Dauzat and later, François de Beaurepaire, there are two possible explanations for such a place name:

First, a small pond must have already existed before the land was given to the monks and have already been called Mortemer like the two other Mortemers, because the word mer "pond" was not used anymore beyond the Xth century. This word is only attested in North-Western France and of Frankish or Saxon origin mari/meri "mere", "lake"; mort(e) "dead" is also quite common to mean "stagnant" (in Port-Mort "the port with stagnant water", Morteau "dead water", etc.). Second, the monks could have given the name Mortemer to their drainage lake to remember the other Mortemer for any kind of reason we don't know, making a pun at the same time with Mer Morte "Dead Sea".

Medieval magnates 

In the Middle Ages, the Mortimers became a powerful dynasty of Marcher Lords in the Welsh Marches, first as barons of Wigmore Castle, Herefordshire and later as Earl of March from 1328 to 1425. Through marriage, the Mortimers came close to the English throne during the reign of Richard II, though their royal claim was ignored after Richard II's deposition by his cousin Henry of Bolingbroke in 1399. The Mortimer claims were later inherited by the House of York, which claimed the throne upon the Earl of March Edward IV's victory in the Battle of Towton, 1461.

Members of the noble Mortimer family included:

Ranulph de Mortimer, Lord of Wigmore, Herefordshire and Seigneur of St Victor-en-Caux, Seine-Maritime, Normandy
Hugh de Mortimer, Lord of Wigmore
Roger Mortimer, Lord of Wigmore
Ralph de Mortimer, Lord of Wigmore
Roger Mortimer, 1st Baron Mortimer (1231–1282)
Isabella Mortimer, Countess of Arundel (after 1247–before 1 April 1292/after 1300)
Edmund Mortimer, 2nd Baron Mortimer (1251–1304)
Roger Mortimer, 1st Earl of March (1287–1330)
Edmund Mortimer (1302–1331)
Katherine Mortimer, Countess of Warwick (1314–1369)
Agnes Mortimer, Countess of Pembroke (1317–1368)
Roger Mortimer, 2nd Earl of March (1328–1360)
Thomas Mortimer (c. 1350–1399), illegitimate member of the Mortimer family who opposed Richard II
Edmund Mortimer, 3rd Earl of March (1352–1381)
Edmund Mortimer (1376–1409)
Roger Mortimer, 4th Earl of March (1374–1398)
Edmund Mortimer, 5th Earl of March (1391–1425)

Other people 
Amanda Jay Mortimer (born 1944), American urban planner and consultant
Angela Mortimer (born 1932), British tennis player
Bob Mortimer (born 1959), English comedian and actor
Carole Mortimer (born 1960), English romance novelist
Chris Mortimer (born 1958), Australian rugby league footballer
Conor Mortimer, Irish Gaelic football player
Daniel Mortimer (born 1989), Australian rugby league footballer
Debra Mortimer, Australian judge
Edmund Mortimer (actor) (1874–1944), American actor and film director
Emily Mortimer (born 1971), English actress
Favell Lee Mortimer (1802–1878), English Evangelical author of educational books for children
Frank Mortimer (1932–2009), English rugby league footballer who played in the 1950s and 1960s
Gary Mortimer (born 1967), English aeronaut
George Ferris Whidborne Mortimer (1805–1871), English schoolmaster and divine
Ian Mortimer (born 1983), Canadian sprint canoeist
Ian Mortimer (historian) (born 1967), British writer
James Mortimer (1833–1911), American chess player, journalist and playwright
James Mortimer (hurdler) (born 1983), New Zealand hurdler
Jill Mortimer (elected 2021), British Conservative politician, MP for Hartlepool
John Mortimer (c. 1656 – 1736), English agriculturalist
John Mortimer (1923–2009), British barrister, dramatist, screenwriter and author
John B. Mortimer, Hong Kong judge
John Hamilton Mortimer (1740–1779), British painter
John Robert Mortimer (1825–1911), Yorkshire corn merchant and archaeologist
Kenneth Mortimer, President Emeritus of Western Washington University, eleventh president of the University of Hawai`i system and Chancellor of the University of Hawai`i at Manoa 1993–2001
Maddie Mortimer (born 1966), British writer
Mary Mortimer (1816–1877), British-born American educator
Minnie Mortimer (born 1980), American fashion designer and socialite
Richard Mortimer (1852–1918), American real estate investor and society leader
Roger Mortimer (racing) (1909–1991), British horse-racing correspondent
Steve Mortimer (born 1956), Australian rugby league footballer
Thomas Mortimer (1730–1810), English writer in the field of economics
Tinsley Mortimer (born 1976), American socialite
Tony Mortimer (born 1970), British songwriter, composer, singer and rapper; member of British 1990s pop group East 17

Fictional characters 
 Colonel Douglas Mortimer, played by Lee Van Cleef in the film For a Few Dollars More
 Dr. Mortimer, in the Sherlock Holmes novel The Hound of the Baskervilles by Sir Arthur Conan Doyle
 Ignatius Mortimer Meen, the villain in the 1995 video game I.M. Meen
 Lord Mortimer, played by Billy House in the 1946 film Bedlam
 Philip Mortimer, a protagonist in Blake and Mortimer, a Belgian comics series created by Edgar P. Jacobs
 Mortimer Brewster, a protagonist in Arsenic and Old Lace and its film adaptation
 Mortimer Crane, the protagonist of the novel Summer Never Ends by Waldo Frank
 Mortimer Delvile, in the novel Cecilia by Frances Burney
 Mortimer Duke, in the movie Trading Places, played by Don Ameche
 Mortimer Harren, a male crewman in Star Trek: Voyager, appearing in the episode 'Good Shepherd'
 Mortimer Scharff, the driver of the hearse Shadow in the popular destruction derby franchise Twisted Metal
 Mortimer Snerd, a ventriloquist's dummy employed by Edgar Bergen
 Mortimer McMire, the primary antagonist of the Commander Keen series
 Mortimer Mouse, a Disney character and rival of Mickey Mouse
 Mortimer "Morte" Rictusgrin, a character and companion in the video game Planescape: Torment
 Mortimer "Morty" Smith, one of the two lead characters in Rick and Morty
 Mortimer Toynbee (Toad), a mutant in the X-Men comics
 Mortimer, lead character in Mortimer, by Robert Munsch
 Mortimer "Mort" Goldman, a stereotypical Jewish man in Family Guy.

See also 
Mort (name)
Morton (surname)

References 

English-language surnames
Surnames of Norman origin